Zsejkei Channel originates on the Mosoni Plain, Little Hungarian Plain, in the county of Györ-Moson-Soprn, Hungary. It runs mainly southeastward to Hédervár, where it flows into the Mosoni-Duna.

Settlements at the banks 
 Dunaremete
 Lipót
 Ásványráró
 Hédervár

Rivers of Hungary
Geography of Győr-Moson-Sopron County